Joe Blandino (born September 13, 1992), is a Dominican singer-songwriter, musician, and actor. Blandino has released two studio albums. He gained a following in the television shows Cantale una bachata a Mama  and posting song covers on social media.

Early life and career 
Blandino was born September 13, 1992 in Santo Domingo, Dominican Republic.

While growing up in Santo Domingo, he sang in many renowned musical groups like Arpa Evangelica as a tenor, participated in the television shows Cantale una bachata a Mama and toured universities in the Dominican Republic which made him a local celebrity in his hometown from a young age.

Gente Normal 
His first studio album, Gente Normal, was recorded in 2019 and marked the beginning of collaborations with Gustavo Galindo a Grammy Nominated Singer-Songwriter and actor and the Mexican singer Andrés Obregón. Gente Normal was produced in the cities of Miami, Mexico City and Santo Domingo and was mixed and mastered by the two times Latin Grammy Winner Thomas Juth in Sweden and London.

Discography 
 Gente Normal (2019)
 Gente Normal Acústico (2020)
"Me haces Tan Feliz" ft. Gustavo Galindo (single)
"Ojalá" ft. Andrés Obregón (single)

References

External links 

 Official Website

People from Santo Domingo
Latin music musicians
Male singer-songwriters
Latin music songwriters
21st-century Dominican Republic male singers
1992 births
Living people
Dominican Republic composers
Dominican Republic people of Italian descent
Dominican Republic people of Spanish descent
Dominican Republic songwriters
Male songwriters
Latin pop singers